Shava Ni Girdhari Lal is a 2021 Indian Punjabi-language comedy film directed by Gippy Grewal from a screenplay co-written with Rana Ranbir. Produced by Gippy Grewal, Vashu Bhagnani and Ashu Munish Sahani under the banners of Humble Motion Pictures, Pooja Entertainment and Omjee Star Studios, it stars Gippy Grewal, Neeru Bajwa, and Himanshi Khurana. Yami Gautam also stars in film marking her comeback in Punjabi film industry after 10 years. The film is a period comedy and plot is set in the 1940s. The principal photography of the film began on 3 April 2021, and it was theatrically released on 17 December 2021.

Cast 
 Gippy Grewal as Girdhari Lal (Magghar Singh Sandhu)
 Neeru Bajwa as Shamo
 Himanshi Khurana as Surjeet Kaur
 Payal Rajput as Kammo
 Sara Gurpal as Jinder
Yami Gautam as Mannat
 Surilie Gautam as Bhaggo
Prabh Grewal 
Tanu Grewal as Kuljeet
Karamjit Anmol as Jaggar Singh
 Rana Ranbir
 Seema Kaushal
 Sardar Sohi
 Raghveer Boli
 Prince Kanwaljit Singh
 Akshita Sharma
 Raj Dhaliwal as Parsinni
 Chandan Gill
 Baljinder Kaur
 Balwinder Begowal
 Ranjit Punia
 Harinder Bhullar
 Dilraj Udey
 Honey Mattu
 Aman Kotish
 Nisha Bano
 Nooran Kaur

Production
Vashu Bhagnani is a co-producer of the film, it is his first Punjabi film as producer. 52 popular actors from Punjabi film industry are cast in one film for the first time.

Principal photography of the film started on 3 April 2021.

Release and reception
The film was released theatrically on 17 December 2021.

Critical response
Kiddaan.com gave the film 2.5 stars out of 5 and praised the performances of cast. They didn't appreciate the theme and ending of the film and stated, "We believe this movie could have been a great watch if the makers would have tried to keep the theme of the movie specific." Concluding they said, "we are ending this review with a very straight forward and not honey-coated conclusion that you might like the movie only if you are a hard-core Gippy Grewal fan."

Soundtrack

The full soundtrack of the film is composed by Jatinder Shah with lyrics by Happy Raikoti, Kumaar, Amrit Maan, Satinder Sartaaj, Ricky Khan. The songs are sung by Gippy Grewal, Sunidhi Chauhan, Satinder Sartaaj, Amrit Maan and G Khan. Title track "Shava Ni Girdhari Lal" was released on 5 December 2021. Second track "Gori Diyan Jhanjhran" sung by Sunidhi Chauhan was released on 8 December 2021.

Track list

References

External links 
 

2021 films
Punjabi-language Indian films
2020s Punjabi-language films
Films scored by Jatinder Shah
Indian comedy films
2021 comedy films